Deer Creek Township may refer to:

Illinois
 Deer Creek Township, Tazewell County, Illinois

Indiana
 Deer Creek Township, Carroll County, Indiana
 Deer Creek Township, Cass County, Indiana
 Deer Creek Township, Miami County, Indiana

Iowa
 Deer Creek Township, Mills County, Iowa
 Deer Creek Township, Webster County, Iowa
 Deer Creek Township, Worth County, Iowa

Kansas
 Deer Creek Township, Allen County, Kansas
 Deer Creek Township, Phillips County, Kansas, in Phillips County, Kansas

Minnesota
 Deer Creek Township, Otter Tail County, Minnesota

Missouri
 Deer Creek Township, Bates County, Missouri
 Deer Creek Township, Henry County, Missouri

Ohio
 Deer Creek Township, Madison County, Ohio
 Deer Creek Township, Pickaway County, Ohio

Pennsylvania
 Deer Creek Township, Mercer County, Pennsylvania

Wisconsin
Deer Creek, Taylor County, Wisconsin
Deer Creek, Outagamie County, Wisconsin

Township name disambiguation pages